John Hey Puget (1829–1894) was a colonel in the 8th King's Royal Irish Hussars. He was a fellow of the Royal Geographical Society.

Puget was the eldest son of John Hey Puget senior and Isabella Hawkins (c. 1797-1882), the daughter of a judge in India. He was educated at Trinity College, University of Cambridge (BA 1849, MA 1854). He married Florence Annie de Arroyave (died 1897) in 1863. They were resident at Poynter's Grove, Totteridge.

Puget and his wife are remembered in a stained-glass window by Kempe in the north wall of St Andrew's church, Totteridge, that depicts St Alban, patron saint of the diocese, and St Andrew.

References

External links 
http://landedfamilies.blogspot.co.uk/2014/01/105-alleyn-of-hatfield-peverel-and.html

1829 births
1894 deaths
St Andrew's church, Totteridge
8th King's Royal Irish Hussars officers
Alumni of Trinity College, Cambridge
Fellows of the Royal Geographical Society